NGC 59 is a lenticular galaxy in the constellation Cetus. It is a probable member of the Sculptor Group. It is approximately 17 million light-years away.

References

External links
SEDS
 
 

Lenticular galaxies
0059
01034
-04-01-026
539-G4
18851110
Cetus (constellation)